Chicxulub, Yucatán may refer to:

 Chicxulub Pueblo, a town
 Chicxulub Pueblo Municipality, a municipality, which has the above town as its seat
 Chicxulub Puerto, a coastal village in Progreso Municipality, Yucatán